The 1971 Prix de l'Arc de Triomphe was a horse race held at Longchamp on Sunday 3 October 1971. It was the 50th running of the Prix de l'Arc de Triomphe.

The winner was Mill Reef, a three-year-old colt trained in England by Ian Balding and ridden by Geoff Lewis. Mill Reef won by three and one-and-a-half lengths from the two fillies Pistol Packer and Cambrizzia in a new race-record time of 2:28.3.

Race details
 Sponsor: none
 Purse: 2,040,000 FF - First Prize: 1,200,000 FF
 Going: Firm
 Distance: 2,400 metres
 Number of runners: 18
 Winner's time: 2:28.3

Full result

* Abbreviations: shd = short-head; nk = neck

Winner's details
Further details of the winner, Mill Reef.
 Sex: Colt
 Foaled: 23 February 1968
 Country: USA
 Sire: Never Bend; Dam: Milan Mill  (Princequillo)
 Owner: Paul Mellon (USA)
 Breeder: Paul Mellon

References

Prix de l'Arc de Triomphe
 1971
Prix de l'Arc de Triomphe
Prix de l'Arc de Triomphe
Prix de l'Arc de Triomphe